The 2021 Southern Frontier Cup is the first edition of the Southern Frontier Cup, an international football tournament held in Surrey, England. It was going to take place from 23 to 24 May 2020 in Whyteleafe, Surrey. The competition was originally scheduled to take place 1 week prior to the 2020 CONIFA World Football Cup in Skopje, North Macedonia, and was intended to serve as a preparation tournament for teams hoping to take part in the World Football Cup which was due to start on 30 May. However, on 20 March 2020 International Surrey Football announced the tournament will be postponed until the summer of 2021 because of the coronavirus pandemic.

On 23 October 2020, International Surrey Football announced that the tournament would be rescheduled for 29–30 May 2021, and would be subject to any COVID-19 restrictions still enforced at the time by the UK Government. On 15 January 2021, International Surrey Football announced the tournament would face further postponement due to continued COVID-19 related uncertainty regarding travel for opposition teams and fan attendance. No new date or time frame was given at the time.

Format
The competition will have the format of a regular knockout competition. The winners of each of the two matches on the first day compete against each other for the Southern Frontier Cup, while the two losing sides play in a third-place match. The trophy will be contested over two days, with each day seeing two matches play back-to-back. Games will be played to 90 minutes if the teams are tied after this time then a penalty shootout will immediately follow.

Participating teams†

† 2020 Teams shown, all 3 invited teams were automatically reinvited to the 2021 edition, but no confirmation of participation has yet been made.

Venue

Matches
All times are local, BST (UTC+1).

Bracket

Semi-finals

Third-place playoff

Final

Final standing

References

External links

CONIFA World Football Cup
Southern Frontier Cup
Southern Frontier Cup
Southern Frontier Cup
Southern Frontier Cup
Southern Frontier Cup